The Rationality Debate—also called the Great Rationality Debate—is the question of whether humans are rational or not. This issue is a topic in the study of cognition and is important in fields such as economics where it is relevant to the theories of market efficiency.

Many studies in experimental psychology have shown that humans often reason in a way that is inaccurate or imperfect—that they do not naturally chose the ideal method or solution. An example of a problem which causes difficulty and debate is the St. Petersburg paradox. This is a lottery which is constructed so that the expected value is infinite but unlikely so that most people will not pay a large fee to play. Gerd Gigerenzer explained that, in this case, mathematicians refined their formulae to model this pragmatic behaviour. Keith Stanovich characterizes this as a Panglossian position in the debate—that humans are fundamentally rational and any variance between the normative position and empirical outcomes may be explained by such adjustments.

See also

References

Citations

Sources

Philosophy of mind
Reasoning
Rational choice theory

